Rules of Play: Game Design Fundamentals is a book on game design by Katie Salen and Eric Zimmerman, published by MIT Press.

Overview
Rules of Play expresses the perspective that a theoretical framework for interactive design has not yet been established.

This is not the first time this has been recognized or explored, but is explored in a fresh way in great detail - with one review stating that: "the book manages to bridge the emerging field of game studies methodologies and design theory".

Another review was also positive: "And if you already are a game designer? In this case, you stand a good chance of becoming a better game designer. Your perception of the internal workings of games will be heightened. You will see structure where before you saw chaos. You will see possibilities where before you saw dead ends. You will see opportunities for meaningful play in every nook and cranny of the game you are working on right now."

The book is divided into four units, first introducing core concepts, then expanding on these with a detailed discussion of rules, play and culture.

Unit 1: Core Concepts

 Meaningful play - The authors introduce the concept of meaningful play as the goal of successful game design, providing their own definitions.
 Design - The authors discuss definitions of design, and introduce their own.  They go on to discuss semiotics, the study of meaning, describing Charles Sanders Peirce's semiotic elements.
 Systems - The authors introduce four elements all systems share, as defined by Stephen Littlejohn in his textbook Theories of Human Communication, and go on to identify each of these elements in the game of chess, when framed as a formal (mathematical), experiential (social), or cultural (representational) system.
 Interactivity - The authors connect interactivity with the concepts introduced thus far, and identify various modes of interactivity, citing examples of cognitive, functional, explicit, and "beyond-the-object" interactivity.
 Defining Games - The authors discuss the relationship between play and games, highlight existing definitions of a game, and provide their own intentionally narrow definitions of games and game design.
 Defining Digital Games - The authors insist that "the underlying properties of games and the core challenges of game design hold true regardless of the medium in which a game manifests," but they do identify four traits that are particularly strong in digital games: Immediate but narrow interactivity, the manipulation of information, automated complex systems, and networked communication.
 The Magic Circle - The authors borrow the term magic circle from the book Homo Ludens by Johan Huizinga, using it to describe the space within which a game takes place.  They explain how players enter into the magic circle by adopting a lusory attitude, another borrowed term, taken from Bernard Suits' book Grasshopper: Games, Life, and Utopia.

Unit 2: Rules
 Defining Rules
 Rules on Three Levels
 The Rules of Digital Games
 Games as Emergent Systems
 Games as Systems of Uncertainty
 Games as Information Theory Systems
 Games as Systems of Information
 Games as Cybernetic Systems
 Games as Game Theory Systems
 Games as Systems of Conflict
 Breaking the Rules

Unit 3: Play
 Defining Play
 Games as the Play of Experience
 Games as the Play of Pleasure
 Games as the Play of Meaning
 Games as Narrative Play
 Games as the Play of Simulation
 Games as Social Play

Unit 4: Culture
 Defining Culture
 Games as Cultural Rhetoric
 Games as Open Culture
 Games as Cultural Resistance
 Games as Cultural Environment

Guest contributions
The book is punctuated by guest contributions, including one essay and four commissioned games, each discussed alongside various prototype materials.

 Foreword: Frank Lantz
 Commissioned Essay: Reiner Knizia
 Unit 1: Commissioned Game: Richard Garfield
 Unit 2: Commissioned Game: Frank Lantz
 Unit 3: Commissioned Game: Kira Snyder
 Unit 4: Commissioned Game: James Ernest

See also
 List of books on computer and video games

References

External links 
 Official MIT Press website, featuring a couple of downloadable chapters and a Table of Contents

2003 non-fiction books
Books about video games
MIT Press books